The USA Falcons, formerly known as the USA Selects, is the second national rugby team for the United States, usually used for uncapped matches and domestic club sides. The primary national team is known as the USA Eagles or the United States national rugby union team.

The USA Selects participated in the Americas Rugby Championship, a tournament originally featuring the "A" sides for Argentina, Canada, the United States, and Uruguay. The ARC is an annual tournament (except for Rugby World Cup years) that replaced the North America 4 competition. The USA Selects' best results in the ARC were their second place finishes in 2013 and 2014. In April and May 2015, the Select side were used for the United States 2015 Rugby World Cup warm-up matches in South America, as part of the Eagles 2015 Rugby World Cup preparations.

Results
The following table shows the results of the USA Selects during annual competitions. In 2016 The Americas Pacific Challenge replaced the ARC as the developmental tournament for the USA Selects.

Overall Record

Up to date as of 2 November 2021

Roster
USA Selects 27-man roster for the uncapped 2018 Americas Pacific Challenge in October 2018.

References

External links
 

United States national rugby union team
Second national rugby union teams